Chintadripet is a railway station on the Chennai MRTS line. It was opened in November 1995. It is built on the bank of Cooum River alongside Arunachala Street, opposite the new secretariat building. The station will be connected with the Chennai Metro Government Estate station, which is currently under construction. The station building contains a 1150 square metres parking area in its lower level.

Sub-station

In 1998, a traction sub-station was established at the station to cater to the power requirement of MRTS. As per the regulations of the Tamil Nadu Electricity Board (TNEB), the minimum monthly charges were to be based on the demand actually recorded in a month or 90 per cent of the contracted demand, whichever was higher. Contracted demand for this sub-station was originally fixed at 5,200 kVA, which was subsequently reduced to 2,500 kVA with effect from February 1999.

Maintenance
In 2010, nearly  3.4 million was spent on various kinds of maintenance activities at the station. The maintenance and beautification effort was carried out for the occasion of the inaugural function of the new secretariat building.

See also
 Chennai MRTS
 Chennai suburban railway
 Chennai Metro
 Transport in Chennai

References

Chennai Mass Rapid Transit System stations
Railway stations in Chennai
Railway stations opened in 1995